Metaxya is a neotropical genus of ferns in the order Cyatheales. It is the only genus in the family Metaxyaceae in the Pteridophyte Phylogeny Group classification of 2016 (PPG I). Alternatively, the genus may be placed in the subfamily Metaxyoideae of a more broadly defined family Cyatheaceae, the family placement used in Plants of the World Online .

The species of the genus are characterized by large fronds that approach 8 ft (2.5 m) in length.

Species
, Plants of the World Online accepted the following species:

Phylogeny
Phylogeny of Metaxya

References

External links

Cyatheales
Fern genera